

References 

Activision